Arcoverde (Green Bow) is a municipality in Pernambuco, Brazil. It is located in the mesoregion of Sertão Pernambucano . Arcoverde has a total area of 353.4 square kilometers and had an estimated population of 74,822 inhabitants in 2020 according with IBGE.

Geography
Arcoverde is located in the Sertao of Pernambuco state. The municipality has the following data:
 Boundaries - Paraíba  (N);  Buíque and Pedra (S), Pesqueira  (E), Sertânia  (W)
 Area - 353.4 km2
 Elevation - 663 m
 Hydrography - Ipanema, Ipojuca and Moxotó rivers
 Vegetation - Caatinga.
 Climate - Semi desertic, ( Sertao) - hot and dry
 Annual average temperature - 22.4 c
 Main road -  BR 232
 Distance to Recife - 254 km

Economy

The main economic activities in Arcoverde are based in general commerce, services and primary sector.

Economic Indicators

Economy by Sector
2006

Health Indicators

References

Municipalities in Pernambuco